The inaugural IPF-affiliated Commonwealth Powerlifting Championships were held in Northumberland, England on the 9–11 September 2005. All credit to Fred McKenzie, Meet Director and Fund Raiser, and Peter Fiore, Director of Powerlifting Great Britain and their teams.

A little short of 100 lifters from eleven nations competed. The nations at the inaugural Championships were:

 
 
 
 
 
 
 
 
 
 
 
 

Nigeria who nominated a team failed to show. Sri Lanka too, who were offered one all-expenses paid trip by the Meet Director to a lifter as a nice gesture following the tsunami disaster did not take up the offer. No doubt there would have been more if this meet had not clashed with the IPF Junior Worlds.

Team England, both males, and females fielding the larger teams understandably took the major trophies. Trophies donated by the IPF were awarded to the best male and female lifter on the Wilks formula, again, both going to England. Drug testing took place - 10 percent of the lifters being tested.

It is proposed that these Championships will be held every two years with New Zealand hosting the next Championships in December 2007. A Commonwealth Powerlifting Federation has been formed and accepted by the IPF. The IPF was formed with only 7 nations and now registers close to 100. One can foresee the Commonwealth Championships becoming a major attraction on the IPF calendar and increasing in numbers dramatically.

The logo was designed by Marc Caisip, along with other, now official, iconography. The technical team for this event was Stuart Hart, Marc Caisip, and Ben Cross.

External links
Photos and results for the 2005 Commonwealth Powerlifting Championships

2005 in sports
Powerlifting
Sport in Northumberland
Powerlifting competitions
2005 in England